A molote is a filled, corn-based pastry usually served as an appetizer or snack in Mexican cuisine. It consists of a dough made from corn masa, sometimes blended with mashed potatoes, that is filled with various ingredients, then fried in lard or oil. In some areas molotes are rolled into cigar shapes or ovals, in others they are formed into half moons similar to empanadas.

See also 

 (corn-based) Empanadas.

References
Gironella De'angeli, Alicia (2006). Larousse de la cocina mexicana. 

Mexican cuisine